Kelly Jury (born 22 October 1996) is a New Zealand netball international. She represented New Zealand at the 2018 and 2022 Commonwealth Games. During the ANZ Championship era Jury played for Waikato Bay of Plenty Magic. Since 2020, she has played for Central Pulse in the ANZ Premiership. Jury was a prominent member of the Pulse teams that won the 2020 and 2022 ANZ Premierships. Alongside Tiana Metuarau, she was co-captain of the 2022 Pulse team. She was the 2022 ANZ Premiership Player of the Year and shared the 2022 Dame Lois Muir Supreme Award with Grace Nweke.

Early life, family and education
Jury is a Māori with Ngāti Kahungunu affiliations. She also has European ancestry. She was born in Stratford, New Zealand.
Kelly grew up on a large sheep and beef farm near Makahu. She attended Makahu Primary School and New Plymouth Girls' High School. She attended the University of Waikato, where she studied for a Bachelor of Sport and Leisure Studies.

Playing career

Early years
Jury began playing netball aged seven. In her youth she played for various representative teams. She played for Taranaki at under-15, under-17 and under-19 levels as well as the New Zealand Maori Secondary Schools and the Manawatu NPC teams. She originally played as a goal shooter before switching to goal keeper. She also captained New Plymouth Girls' High School. Shortly after been named in the 2015 Waikato Bay of Plenty Magic squad she suffered an Achilles tendon rupture while playing for her school.

Waikato Bay of Plenty Magic
Between 2015 and 2019, Jury made 40 senior league appearances for Waikato Bay of Plenty Magic. Jury was just 17 and still attending New Plymouth Girls' High School when she signed her first Magic contract. However she missed the 2015 season because of injury. During a 2018 Round 2 match against Southern Steel, Jury suffered a dislocated shoulder. She subsequently missed most of the season.

Central Pulse
Jury signed for Central Pulse ahead of the 2020 ANZ Premiership season. She made her debut for Pulse during the pre-season Otaki tournament. She was a member of the Pulse team that were 2020 minor premiers and overall champions. Although Jury mainly plays as a goalkeeper, she can also play as a goal defender. Ahead of the 2022 ANZ Premiership season, Jury was named Pulse co-captain alongside Tiana Metuarau.
Jury was a stand out player for the 2022 Central Pulse team that won the premiership title. She was included in Brendon Egan's Stuffs team of the season, was named MVP as Pulse defeated Stars 56–37 in the grand final, was named the 2022 ANZ Premiership Player of the Year and shared the 2022 Dame Lois Muir Supreme Award with Grace Nweke.

New Zealand
Jury was a member of the New Zealand team that won the 2016 Fast5 Netball World Series. Jury made her senior debut for New Zealand on 2 February 2017 during a Quad Series match against England. She came on in the final quarter and helped New Zealand secure a 61–37 win. She was subsequently a member of the New Zealand team that won the 2017 Netball World Youth Cup. She was the player of the match as New Zealand defeated Australia 60–57 in the final. In September 2017, she was again player of the match as New Zealand defeated Australia 57–47 to win their first Quad Series. She went on to represent New Zealand at the 2018 and 2022 Commonwealth Games.

Statistics

|- 
! scope="row" style="text-align:center" |2016
|style="text-align:center;"|Magic
|  || ||  || || || || || || ||8 
|- style="background-color: #eaeaea"
! scope="row" style="text-align:center" |2017
|style="text-align:center;"|Magic
|0/0||?||21||0||?||37||63||198||3||15  
|- 
! scope="row" style="text-align:center" |2018
|style="text-align:center;"|Magic
|0/0||?||1||0||?||5||7||18||1||2   
|- style="background-color: #eaeaea"
! scope="row" style="text-align:center" |2019
|style="text-align:center;"|Magic
|0/0||0||27||0||0||37||79||187||5||15  
|- 
! scope="row" style="text-align:center" |2020
|style="text-align:center;"|Pulse
|0/0||0||14||0||0||26||47||153||6||14  
|- style="background-color: #eaeaea"
! scope="row" style="text-align:center" |2021
|style="text-align:center;"|Pulse
|0/0||1||14||19||2||21||51||170||12||14   
|- 
! scope="row" style="text-align:center" |2022
|style="text-align:center;"|Pulse
|0/0||0||36||0||0||46||116||189||9||16   
|- style="background-color: #eaeaea"
! scope="row" style="text-align:center" |2023
|style="text-align:center;"|Pulse
|  || ||  || || || || || || ||  
|- class="sortbottom"
! colspan=2| Career
! 
! 
! 
! 
! 
! 
! 
! 
! 
! 
|}

Honours
Central PulseANZ PremiershipWinners: 2020, 2022 
Minor premiers: 2020, 2022
New ZealandNetball Quad SeriesWinners: 2017 (August/September)Taini Jamison TrophyWinners: 2020, 2022Netball World Youth CupWinners: 2017Fast5 Netball World Series'''Winners'': 2016

Individual Awards

References 

1996 births
Living people
New Zealand netball players
New Zealand international netball players
New Zealand international Fast5 players
Commonwealth Games medallists in netball
Commonwealth Games bronze medallists for New Zealand
Netball players at the 2018 Commonwealth Games
Netball players at the 2022 Commonwealth Games
Commonwealth Games competitors for New Zealand
Waikato Bay of Plenty Magic players
Central Pulse players
ANZ Championship players
ANZ Premiership players
New Zealand Māori netball players
Ngāti Kahungunu people
Sportspeople from Stratford, New Zealand
People educated at New Plymouth Girls' High School
University of Waikato alumni
Medallists at the 2022 Commonwealth Games